The Solaire Open was a golf tournament on the Asian Tour. It was first played in 2013 at the Wack Wack Golf and Country Club (East course) in Manila, Philippines. The second and final event was held at The Country Club in Santa Rosa, Laguna, in the outskirts of Manila.

Winners

References

External links
Coverage on the Asian Tour's official site

Former Asian Tour events
Golf tournaments in the Philippines
Sports in Metro Manila
Sports in Laguna (province)